Kirsten Sinding-Larsen (4 August 1898 – 10 December 1978) was a Norwegian architect.

She was born in Kristiania (now Oslo), Norway. She was the daughter of colonel Birger Fredrik Sinding-Larsen (1867–1941) and Emilie Rustad (1871–1904). She was a paternal granddaughter of jurist and writer Alfred Sinding-Larsen, niece of physician Christian Magnus Sinding-Larsen, architect Holger Sinding-Larsen and painter Kristofer Sinding-Larsen, first cousin of journalist Henning Sinding-Larsen and grandniece of architect Balthazar Lange.

She finished her secondary education in 1912, and studied at the Norwegian National Academy of Craft and Art Industry (now Oslo National Academy of the Arts) from 1915 to 1917. She worked as an apprentice to architect Sigurd Lunde in Bergen from 1919 to 1921. She worked with architect Håkon Ahlberg in Stockholm from 1923 to 1925 and Tage William-Olsson to 1927. She studied architecture at the Royal Institute of Technology from 1927 to 1929. She was employed by architects Gustav Classon and Wolter Gahn in Stockholm from 1929 to 1932. She returned to Oslo in 1932 and worked for a short time with her uncle architect Holger Sinding-Larsen before establishing her own practice in 1933.

During the period 1933–38, she designed a number of homes in Moss and Jeløy in Østfold. Her most notable single work was the design of Sunnaas Hospital at Nesodden in the mid-1950s. She is also remembered as a debater of housing policy.

References

1898 births
1978 deaths
Architects from Oslo
20th-century Norwegian architects
Norwegian women architects
Norwegian expatriates in Sweden
Oslo National Academy of the Arts alumni
KTH Royal Institute of Technology alumni